Prof. Dr. Carlos Trincão (30 May 1903 – 1968) was a Portuguese philatelist who signed the Roll of Distinguished Philatelists in 1953.

References

Portuguese philatelists
Signatories to the Roll of Distinguished Philatelists
1903 births
1968 deaths